TV Talent Scout was an early Australian television series, which aired circa 1957 to 1958 on Sydney station ATN-7. The series was hosted by Bob Pollard, with other regulars including pianist Terry Wilkinson and organist Tommy Lane.

As the title suggests, it was a talent contest. For example, in one episode the performers were singer Keith McKeachie, singer Marcia Capelle (real name Mrs. W. Wiggins), singer and tap-dancer Ray Dowsett, and violinist Helen Quinn. In another episode, the performers were comedian Pamela Hawken, singing act The Ross Brothers, singer Val Collet, and piano-accordionist Benny Saitta.

Although kinescope recording existed during the run of the series, it is not known if any of the episodes are still extant.

References

External links

Seven Network original programming
1957 Australian television series debuts
1958 Australian television series endings
Australian variety television shows
Black-and-white Australian television shows
English-language television shows